Dorian McMenemy (born October 28, 1996) is a swimmer who competes for the Dominican Republic in the women's 100 meter butterfly. At the 2012 Summer Olympics she finished 41st overall in the heats in the Women's 100 metre butterfly. In 2016, Dorian competed in the 50 Freestyle in Rio de Janeiro.

McMenemy was born in the United States and lives with her mother, father, and three sisters in Northborough, Massachusetts, where she attended Algonquin Regional High School. Her mother, Luisa, is from the Dominican Republic and Dorian has dual citizenship with both countries. She was the only female swimmer on the Dominican team and was named the Dominican Female Athlete of the Year.

In 2015, she started attending Wagner College in Staten Island, New York on a full athletic scholarship.

References

Dominican Republic female swimmers
1996 births
Living people
Olympic swimmers of the Dominican Republic
Swimmers at the 2012 Summer Olympics
Swimmers at the 2016 Summer Olympics
Female butterfly swimmers
People from Northborough, Massachusetts
American female swimmers
Sportspeople from Worcester County, Massachusetts
21st-century American women